Laura J. Lederer (born 1951) is a pioneer in the work to stop human trafficking. She is a legal scholar and former Senior Advisor on Trafficking in Persons in the Office for Democracy and Global Affairs of the United States Department of State. She has also been an activist against human trafficking, prostitution, pornography, and hate speech. Lederer is founder of The Protection Project, a legal research institute at Johns Hopkins University devoted to combating trafficking in persons.

Early life 
Lederer was born in the Detroit area, to parents Natalie and Creighton Lederer, a civil engineer and later Detroit Commissioner of Buildings and Safety in the Coleman Young administration. She was born into a multifaith household, with a Jewish father and Lutheran mother who were practicing Unitarian Universalists, and studied comparative religion as an undergraduate at University of Michigan. As part of her undergraduate work, she spent two years studying under and working for David Noel Freedman, and graduated with a BA magna cum laude in 1975.

Career summary

Past career 

In the mid-1970s she was an activist and leader in the violence against women movement. In 1977 she helped found and then directed the first women's anti-pornography organization in the country.  Also in 1977, became an associate of the Women's Institute for Freedom of the Press (WIFP). WIFP is an American nonprofit publishing organization. The organization works to increase communication between women and connect the public with forms of women-based media. She founded and directed The Protection Project, a legal research and human rights institute at Harvard University's John F. Kennedy School of Government in 1997.  There, she collected and translated foreign national law on involuntary servitude, slavery, trafficking in persons and related issues and created an international database housing over 3,000 statutes from 190 countries. She also tracked global routes, patterns, and trends in human trafficking and published the first Human Rights Report on Trafficking in Persons. In 2000, she moved The Protection Project to Johns Hopkins University School of Advanced International Studies (SAIS), where it is housed today.

During the drafting of the Trafficking Victims Protection Act, from 1998 to 2000, she served as a witness in hearings held by Representatives Chris Smith and Sam Gjendenson in the House of Representatives International Subcommittee on Human Rights and the late Senator Paul Wellstone and Sam Brownback in the Senate, testifying on the global nature and scope of the problem of trafficking in persons. She brought trafficking victims from over a dozen countries to testify in Congress. In 1998, she also played a vital role in bringing together a new bi-partisan anti-trafficking coalition of women's groups such as Equality Now, and faith-based groups such as The Salvation Army, and the National Association of Evangelicals. This coalition played an important role in the passage of the Trafficking Victims Protection Act of 2000.

In 2001, as Deputy Senior Advisor to the Secretary of State she helped stand up the Office to Monitor and Combat Trafficking in Persons at the U.S. Department of State. In From 2002 – 2007, she served as Senior Advisor on Trafficking in Persons to Under Secretary of State for Democracy and Global Affairs, Paula J. Dobriansky. In that capacity she advised the Under Secretary on policy formulation and development, program creation and implementation, and long-range planning for the Office for Global Affairs. She represented the Under Secretary at high-level national and international meetings, spoke extensively as a recognized expert at governmental, inter-governmental, non-governmental, academic and other conferences, seminars, and meetings.  She also advised the Ambassador-at-Large on Trafficking in Persons and other key governmental officials, as well as serving as liaison to civil society.

Current career

Currently Laura Lederer is affiliated with the anti-trafficking NGOs Global Centurion and Triple S Network.

She is also an adjunct professor of law at Georgetown Law Center, where teaches (with Professor Mohamad Mattar) a course entitled, "International Trafficking in Persons," a JD/LLM class that covers  U.S federal and state law on human trafficking; foreign national anti-trafficking law; and international instruments addressing human trafficking. The course also examines the global scope of the trafficking problem including trafficking routes and patterns; the similarities and differences between sex and labor trafficking; the relationship of human trafficking to drug and arms trafficking; trafficking and terrorism; the public health implications of trafficking; child sex tourism; trafficking and international migration; transnational issues in trafficking such as international peacekeeping, corruption, money-laundering, international adoption, and more.

Anti-pornography activism (1976–1981) 
In late 1976, she accompanied a friend to a San Francisco conference on violence against women. A display at the conference included images from magazine advertising, softcore pornography, and hardcore pornography, including child pornography. Lederer stated in a later interview: "You saw the influence of the really hard-core images, back through the soft-core to the mainstream. Images were repeated. That's how I got involved. It kind of clicked." Several participants in the conference proposed to keep meeting and form an organization devoted to protesting violent images of women. In January 1977, this organization was started, which after several name changes became Women Against Violence in Pornography and Media (WAVPM). Lederer signed on as the organization's national coordinator and editor of its newsletter.

As coordinator of WAVPM, Lederer helped organize protests and boycotts against companies such as Max Factor and Finnair whose advertising the organization felt encouraged violence against women. She also organized educational tours of pornographic businesses in San Francisco's red light districts, a tactic later emulated by Women Against Pornography. Lederer worked closely with then-Supervisor Dianne Feinstein on a San Francisco anti-pornography zoning ordinance targeting sex-related businesses. Lederer was aided in this effort by the fact that her father, in the role of Building Commissioner in Detroit, had worked vigorously for shaping and enforcing a similar zoning ordinance in that city. Lederer traveled to Detroit to research the ordinance there, and passed the results along to Feinstein. Though the zoning ordinance faced stiff opposition (notably from the San Francisco ACLU and from Harvey Milk), a milder version of this ordinance was passed in 1978.

In the summer of 1978, Lederer brought on Lynn Campbell to help organize WAVPM and together they helped organize Feminist Perspectives on Pornography, the first national anti-pornography feminist conference held in San Francisco on November 17–19, 1978. The conference drew many well known feminist speakers, notably Gloria Steinem, Robin Morgan, Phyllis Chesler, Kathleen Barry, Susan Brownmiller and Andrea Dworkin. This conference was significant in that it served as a galvanizing event for the anti-pornography feminist movement in the United States. The final event of the conference was the first Take Back the Night march, which converged on the Broadway red light district. The talks given during the event were later collected in the anthology Take Back the Night—a work which was compiled and edited by Lederer and would go on to stand as a key document in the emerging feminist anti-pornography movement.

Anti-human trafficking work

Early anti-human trafficking work (1993–2001)
In 1994, Lederer founded The Protection Project, a legal research institute dedicated to tracking and combating human trafficking.  There, she created a database of foreign national law on involuntary servitude, slavery, trafficking in persons and related issues. In 1998 Lederer oversaw the project's transition to the John F. Kennedy School of Government at Harvard University, where she remained for three years (1998–2001). A core component of this work centered on the publication of the first Human Rights Report on Trafficking in Persons, a document pre-dating the U.S. government TIP Report that tracked and evaluated in 194 countries the global routes, patterns, and trends in human trafficking as well as laws, law enforcement, and case law addressing it.

During the drafting of the Trafficking Victims Protection Act, from 1998 to 2000, she served as a witness in Senate Foreign Relations Committee and House International Relations Committee hearings held by Representatives Chris Smith and Sam Gejdenson and the late Senator Paul Wellstone and Senator Sam Brownback, testifying on the global nature and scope of the problem of trafficking in persons. She was instrumental in bringing trafficking victims from over a dozen countries to testify in Congress. In 1998, she also helped bring together a new bi-partisan anti-trafficking coalition of women's groups and faith-based groups. This coalition played a role in the passage of the Trafficking Victims Protection Act of 2000.

Senior Advisor on Human Trafficking (2001–2009)
In 2001, as Deputy Senior Advisor to the Secretary of State she helped set up the Office to Monitor and Combat Trafficking in Persons at the U.S. Department of State. In From 2002 to 2009, she served as Senior Advisor on Trafficking in Persons to Under Secretary of State for Democracy and Global Affairs, Paula J. Dobriansky. In that capacity she advised the Under Secretary on policy formulation and development, program creation and implementation, and long-range planning for the Office for Global Affairs.

Lederer was Senior Advisor on Human Trafficking at the U.S. Department of State during the administration of George W. Bush. She was responsible for designing specialized anti-trafficking programs, including  "TIP and New Technologies," "The Economics of Trafficking," "The Health Implications of Trafficking," and a new program to research the impact of sex selection and gender imbalance on human trafficking. In addition to her duties as Senior Advisor, she was instrumental in creating the Senior Policy Operating Group on Trafficking in Persons, for which she was Executive Director from 2001 to 2009. This high-level interagency policy group staffs the cabinet-level President's Interagency Task Force on Trafficking in Persons. She is also an adjunct professor of law at the Georgetown University Law Center.

As of 2010, Lederer is actively involved in combating human trafficking. Both in her role as President of Global Centurion, a Washington DC based NGO which seeks to eradicate child sex trafficking by focusing on the demand for trafficked children; and as founder and coordinator of Triple S Network, a group of nearly 100 NGOs active against sex trafficking.

Media consultant
 "The Day My God Died": Lederer was an expert consultant to this, a feature-length documentary, which casts a spotlight on the devastating impact child sex trafficking has wreaked upon young girls in Bombay, India.
 "Trade": Lederer was an expert consultant to this, a feature-length drama, which depicts the real life phenomena of international sex trafficking.

Philanthropic work
Lederer engaged in designing grant programs for philanthropic organizations. She served as an officer at the Skaggs Foundation beginning in 1979 and was a founding member of the Global Fund for Women in 1987. In 1989, she began her legal education at University of San Francisco before transferring after one year to DePaul University College of Law, where she earned a Juris Doctor in 1994.
She served as Program Officer for Community Concerns at the L.J. and Mary C. Skaggs Foundation, during which times she created a special International Women's Program

Education, awards, and honors 
She received her B.A. magna cum laude in comparative religions from the University of Michigan. After 10 years in philanthropy as director of community and social concerns at a private foundation, she continued her education at the University of San Francisco Law School and DePaul College of Law and received her Juris Doctor in June 1994.  She received scholarships from the University of San Francisco Law School's Alumni Women's Association and was Mansfield Fellow of Law at DePaul College of Law in 1992.   In 1997, she received the Gustavus Meyers Center for Study of Human Rights Annual Award for Outstanding Work on Human Rights for her work on harmful speech issues. She served on the Peer Review Advisory Committee, U.S. Office of Juvenile Justice and Delinquency Prevention for the research project, "Sexual Exploitation and Family Violence," 1984–1986, and was the youngest member of the National Task Force on Missing Children Advisory Council, U.S. Office of Juvenile Justice, in 1985.  
2012 Gray/Wawro Lecturer on Gender, Health, and Well-Being at Rice University's James Baker III Institute
2009 September, recipient of the University of Michigan College of Literature, Science, and the Arts Humanitarian Service Award for her work to abolish human trafficking.
 Recipient of the Paul H. Nitze School of Advanced International Studies Protection Project Human Rights Award for her "invaluable contribution to the global movement to stop human trafficking."
1997-2001 ECPAT (End Child Prostitution and Trafficking) USA, Board of Directors
1997 recipient the Gustavus Meyers Center for Study of Human Rights Annual Award for Outstanding Work on Human Rights for book on hate speech, The Price We Pay.
1995 Editor and Contributor, The Price We Pay: The Case Against Racist Speech, Hate Propaganda, and Pornography, published by Farrar, Straus and Giroux in 1995.
1992 Mansfield Fellow of Law at DePaul College of Law
1991 recipient of scholarship from the USF Law School's Alumni Women's Association in 1991
1988-1992 Global Fund for Women, founding member and board of directors
1988-1989 Council on Foundations Program Committee
1985 Served on National Task Force on Missing Children Advisory Council (precursor to the National Center for Missing and Exploited Children), U.S. Office of Juvenile Justice, in 1985..
1984-1986 served on the Peer Review Advisory Committee, U.S. Office of Juvenile Justice and Delinquency Prevention for the research project, "Sexual Exploitation and Family Violence,"
1980 Editor and contributor, Take Back the Night, published in 1980 by William and Morrow (hardcover) and Bantam Books (paperback).

Selected quotes 
I am happy to be here, on Law Day, to talk with you about human trafficking.  For the past few years I have been calling human trafficking ... a contemporary form of slavery.  When I first made the comparison, I took some heat.  Critics said that "slavery" was too strong a term. That it referenced a particular period in our country's history ... that true slavery doesn't exist today. [However] as I examined it further, I became convinced that the comparison was apt.  In a previous century, Africans labored in the tobacco fields, and slaves were bred for strength and endurance.  The fields have been replaced by brothels and sex shops, and the new trade is in young women and children. Yet even with these changes, the similarities are striking:
As were African slaves, these young women are tricked, deceived, lured, induced, kidnapped, and coerced into bondage.
They are taken from their native homelands and moved vast distances to foreign countries.
In these new places, they do not know the language, the culture, the laws.  They are separated from family and friends.  They have no identification papers, no passports, no visas. Strangers in a strange land, they have no way to escape.
As were slaves of earlier times, they are under the complete control of the people who have enslaved them. If they don't do what they are told, they are held without food or water, beaten and raped, their families threatened.
And perhaps most important, as were the slaves of earlier times, they are forced to do someone else's bidding for someone else's financial gain.

Unlike drugs ... human beings can be sold over and over again. ... The problem has always been marginalized, but it is so great that it can't be ignored any longer.

We started by bringing trafficking victims from Russia, the Ukraine, Nepal, India, and Mexico to the U.S. House and Senate to testify at Congressional hearings, because we knew that if American citizens heard their terrible stories we would be successful in passing a new law.  We organized education and awareness campaigns on sex trafficking and labor trafficking in the U.S. and abroad.  And, perhaps most important, we dared to challenge a subtext in the mainstream human rights movement, a subtext that said, "If we can only get  AIDS, STDs, violence, exploitation and rape, drug addiction and drug trafficking, international organized crime and other horrible elements out of prostitution, then it could be a legitimate career option for young women.

In addition to the three Ps (Prevention, Prosecution, and Protection) we also need the four Rs:  rescue, rehabilitation, restoration, and reintegration.

Human trafficking ... must be fought on three fronts: Supply, demand, distribution. You have to address all three at one time instead of just one or the other. Preventive campaigns without  interdiction, without the high penalties that make it high risk, will not work. Likewise, it is important to address the demand side: the customers who purchase trafficked humans. There is explosive growth of child prostitution worldwide, often linked to trafficking.  [T]he phenomenon is fueled by Western demand, and the U.S. increasingly is addressing demand.

Victims of trafficking often endure brutal conditions that result in serious physical and mental health problems. These include HIV/AIDS and other sexually transmitted diseases, as well as other serious communicable diseases such as hepatitis and tuberculosis. Rape, assault, battery, and other forms of violence are also common. Victims of human trafficking also have reproductive problems such as pelvic inflammatory disease, forced abortion, and/or abortion related complications. Unwanted pregnancies are common. Finally, the health implications of sex trafficking extend not only to victims and their children, but also to the customers/users, who can be infected or become carriers and transmitters of these diseases. In the U.S., victims are being trafficked from countries as disparate as India, Thailand, Russia, Cameroon, Mexico, Honduras, and many more. Most often, they are from resource poor countries with more than their share of serious health problems. Some of these countries have a thriving sex industry make them epicenters for epidemics. And  where people are being moved vast distances around the globe to do someone else's bidding for someone else's gain, the epidemics are moving with them, thereby having a direct impact on the health of the destination country.

Media reports would have us believe that commercial sexual exploitation is confined to a few poor regions of the world. But new evidence demonstrates that every country, rich or poor, North or South, produces its own child sexual abusers. Laws and law enforcement to prevent child sexual exploitation are hopelessly inadequate.  Around the world, the definition of a child varies so widely as to make it impossible to have a cooperative effort protecting children from sexual exploitation. In Tanzania and the Philippines, the age of majority is 12; in a dozen other countries, it is 14: over 100 countries set the age of majority at 18. But these same countries have variations on age of consent to sexual relations.  Thus, what may be illegal sexual relations or statutory rape in England may be legal in a Southeast Asian country. A country that prohibits child prostitution but makes the age of majority 12 has no protection for a teenage child targeted by an adult exploiter. . Countries must examine their definitions of child and the age of consent for sexual relations. As much as possible, nations should regularize these definitions, taking into account what we already know about the universal physical, psychological and emotional development of a human being. Only an international campaign can make cooperation among law enforcement agencies feasible."

Survivors have a great deal to offer in the realm of anti-trafficking work.  They are the ones who have real-life experience with trafficking. They have a knowledge and expertise that cannot be gained from any textbook or course of training.  We need to make our programs more survivor-centered, not out of pity for the survivors, but because every aspect of our programs, whether prevention, prosecution, or protection, will be strengthened, and ultimately more successful, if we do incorporate survivors.  For example:
 was a survivor who traced the trafficking routes in one of the first sex trafficking cases in the U.S. She identified the small town in Mexico where the recruiting took place, described the four-day walk through the Mexican desert and across the Rio Grande, told of the houses in transit cities where the traffickers harbored them, and identified the series of trailer brothels in a small rural town in Florida where she and many other young women and children were forced into prostitution through violence, threats, and intimidation.  This intelligence was critical in designing interventions tailored to the problem.  It could not be readily obtained in any other way.
It was a survivor in India who returned to her trafficker with a group of anti-trafficking law enforcement officials, and led them to the brothel to which she was trafficked when she was 11, to show us the hollow wall behind which children were hidden whenever there were raids, resulting in the rescue of some fifteen more children that day.
It is survivors who have designed the most successful rehabilitation programs for other survivors.  Why?  Because they know in intimate detail the physical and mental hell of slavery and can therefore shape programs that hit the mark, both for emergency shelters when victims are first rescued, and for longer term employment and education programs that can help people learn new skills for survival.

Publications 
Editor and contributor, "Take Back the Night: Women on Pornography", published in 1980 by William and Morrow.
Editor, The Price We Pay: The Case Against Racist Speech, Hate Propaganda, and Pornography, published by Farrar, Straus and Giroux in 1995.
Author, "Where have all the young girls gone? Female Feticide and its Impact on Human Trafficking"
Author, "The Health Consequences of Sex Trafficking and Their Implications for Identifying Victims in Healthcare Facilities", published in 2014 by Loyola University Chicago Annals of Health Laws

References

Sources

External links
 "TCW Talks to ... Laura Lederer", interview by Camerin Courtney, Today's Christian Woman, January/February 2008.
 "Trafficking as a Law Enforcement Issue", interview by David Denton and Caroline Vasquez, The Yale Globalist, March 1, 2004. (Archived at State.gov.)
 "Alumna Works to Eradicate Sexual Trafficking" by Lawrence Arendt, Dialogue 16(1): 6, Fall/Winter 2002. (scroll down)
 "Enslaved by His Sources" by Jack Shafer, Slate, February 3, 2004.
  by Bob Jones, World, June 15, 2002.
  by Mindy Belz, World, March 25, 2000.
  (scroll down), International Affairs Council, Idaho State University. – Further biographical information.

1951 births
Living people
University of Michigan College of Literature, Science, and the Arts alumni
Feminist studies scholars
Anti-pornography feminists
Anti-prostitution activists in the United States
American human rights activists
Women human rights activists
George W. Bush administration personnel
DePaul University College of Law alumni
University of San Francisco alumni
American women lawyers
American people of Jewish descent
Lawyers from Detroit
21st-century American women